Weihui South railway station is a railway station in Weihui, Xinxiang, Henan, China. It is an intermediate stop on the currently under construction Zhengzhou–Jinan high-speed railway.

See also
Weihui railway station

References 

Railway stations in Henan
Railway stations in China opened in 2022